Vlorë railway station is a railway station serving the city of Vlorë in southwestern Albania, the third most populous city of the Republic of Albania.

The station is the southern terminus of the Durrës-Vlorë railway line, and is the southernmost station on the Albanian railway network. It opened in 1985 when the railway line was extended from Nartë to Vlorë.

Services

Only a very limited service remained in operation until 2015. The single departure left at 05.00, arriving to Kashar at 10.52. A corresponding service from Kashar to Vlorë departed at 13.15, arriving at 19.00. Currently, passenger services no longer run south of Fier. A limited service was still in operation on the line until 2015, but passenger services no longer run south of Fier.

A private railway company, Albrail, was granted a concession to the railway section between Fier and Vlorë in February 2016 and started transport of crude oil from Fier to Vlorë in December 2018.

Gallery

References

External links

 Albrail - railway company, operator of the Fier-Vlorë railway line

Vlorë
Railway stations in Albania
Railway stations opened in 1985
1985 establishments in Albania